This is the videography of Tinchy Stryder (Kwasi Danquah III), and it consists of twenty-five music videos as a lead artist, fifteen music videos as a featured artist, and three music video cameo appearances, one film and one television appearances. In total he has been in a total of forty-three music videos, one movie and television program to date.

He took a lead role on the music video for "Spinnin' for 2012" (2011) which was the official olympic torch song for the 2012 Olympic Games, and the music video was directed by American filmmaker Dale Resteghini. He later released the music video for "Bright Lights" (2012) from his fourth studio album Full Tank, which was also directed by Dale Resteghini. "Gangsta?" (2010) and "Game Over" (2010) from his third studio album Third Strike were directed by Adam Powell. Emil Nava directed "Never Leave You" (2009), "Second Chance" (2010) and "In My System" (2010) from his second studio album Catch 22 and third studio album Third Strike. The music video "Let It Rain" (2011) —a collaboration with Melanie Fiona—which was set in Los Angeles from his third studio album Third Strike and "Off The Record" (2011) —a collaboration with Calvin Harris—which was set in Las Vegas from his fourth studio album Full Tank were directed by Luke Monaghan and James Barber.

His music videos from his second studio album Catch 22, "Stryderman" (2008) directed by Emil Nava, "Number 1" (2009) directed by Emil Nava and "Spaceship" (2011) —which was set in Portofino, Liguria, Italy and directed by Luke Monaghan and James Barber have received award nominations, in which "Spaceship" received a MOBO Award for Best Video. The recent video to be released is the music video from his fifth studio album End of Life on Earth for "Help Me" (2012) —which was set in scenes focused on Christian iconography in New Orleans was directed by Dan Henshaw.

He made an appearance on the television program The Only Way Is Essex on the episode The Only Way Is Essex (series 5) that was filmed in Spain, and released on 13 June 2012. He has also been cast in the movie by Keith Lemon, entitled Keith Lemon: The Film, which was released on 24 August 2012.

Music videos

As lead artist

Notes:

A^ The single "Stryderman" is Danquah's first single to chart on the UK Singles Chart, charting at #73. The music video won the award for Best Video at the 2008 UK-Urban Music Awards (UMA), as well as a nomination for Best Video at the 2008 MOBO Awards (Music of Black Origin).
B^ The single "Number 1" is Danquah's first single to reach #1 on the UK Singles Chart. The music video led to Danquah being nominated for Best UK & Ireland New Act at the 2009 MTV Europe Music Awards (EMA), as well as nominations for Best Song at the 2009 MOBO Awards (Music of Black Origin), Best Video - In association with MTV Base at the 2010 MOBO Awards, and Brit Award for British Single at the 2010 Brit Awards.
C^ The single "Spaceship" is Danquah's first top five single since 2009, charting at #5 on the UK Singles Chart. The music video won the award for Best Video at the 2011 MOBO Awards (Music of Black Origin), as well as nominations for Best Collaboration sponsored by Corona Extra and Best Single at the 2011 UK-Urban Music Awards (UMA).

Featured music videos

Cameo appearances

Filmography

See also 
 List of songs
 Music discography

References and notes

General

Specific 

Tinchy Stryder
Tinchy Stryder